Fred Frank Girod (born 1951) is an American politician and dentist from Oregon. He is a member of the Oregon State Senate representing the 9th district, which covers the mid-Willamette Valley, and previously served as the Senate minority leader. He was later succeeded by incumbent minority leader Tim Knopp.

Early life and education 
Girod was born in Salem, Oregon. He graduated from Stayton High School in Stayton, Oregon. He earned a Bachelor of Science degree from Oregon State University in Corvallis, Oregon, a DMD from Oregon Health & Science University School of Dentistry, and a Master of Public Administration from Harvard University.

Career 
He has been a practicing dentist for 26 years, and served in the Oregon House of Representatives in the early 1990s, chairing the Rules Committee. He ran for the U.S. Congress in 1994, but lost in the primary to Jim Bunn.

Girod then served on the Stayton City Council. He was selected by Marion and Linn County Republicans to run again for the House in 2006, in district 17, following then-representative Jeff Kropf's sudden departure from the 2006 election. He won that election, defeating Democrat Dan Thackaberry, and was appointed in 2008 to succeed Senator Roger Beyer of District 9 upon his resignation. He was sworn in during January 2008, and was re-elected in November 2008, 2010, 2012, and 2016.

2019 Senate Republican walkouts 
From June 20, 2019, all 11 Republican members of the Oregon Senate, including Girod, refused to show up for work at the Oregon State Capitol, instead going into hiding, some even fleeing the state. Their aim was to push the vote on a cap-and-trade proposal that would dramatically lower greenhouse gas emissions by 2050 to combat climate change to voters instead of being instituted by lawmakers. The Senate holds 30 seats, but 1 is vacant due to a death. Without the Republican senators, the remaining 18 Democratic state senators could not reach a quorum of 20 to hold a vote. Although several Republican state senators returned to the Senate chamber on June 29, 2019, leading to the cap-and-trade bill being sent back to committee, while other bills were passed, Girod was missing, and it was stated that he would not return for the month's legislative session.

Personal life 
Girod lives in Stayton, Oregon.

Girod's home was destroyed in the 2020 Western United States wildfires. He and his wife did not take their three pet cats with them when they fled their home in the middle of the night. He later said he did not know if they survived and hoped that they did.

References

External links
 Legislative website
 Project VoteSmart biography

1951 births
21st-century American politicians
American dentists
Harvard Kennedy School alumni
Living people
Republican Party members of the Oregon House of Representatives
Oregon city council members
Oregon Health & Science University alumni
Republican Party Oregon state senators
Oregon State University alumni
People from Stayton, Oregon
Politicians from Salem, Oregon